Eadberht is an Anglo-Saxon male name. It may refer to:

Eadberht of Lincoln
Eadberht of Lindisfarne
Eadberht of Northumbria
Eadberht of Selsey
Eadbert I of Kent
Eadberht II of Kent
Eadberht III Præn of Kent
Eadberht (Bishop of London)
Eadberht of Lichfield

Germanic masculine given names